Carton Brewing is a craft brewery in Atlantic Highlands in Monmouth County, New Jersey, that produces beer, as well as operating a tasting room and retail store on site.

History
Carton Brewing was founded in 2011 by cousins Augie Carton and Chris Carton. Wanting to "draw from the flavors and cultures of their native community", the cousins decided to open in the Jersey Shore town of Atlantic Highlands in a 5,000 sq ft red-brick historic warehouse.  In the spring of 2018, Carton moved the majority of its brewing operations into a newly constructed 10,000 sq ft facility, adjacent to original location. The original location continues to house the tasting room and retail store, as well as production of sour beer and saison in a 30-barrell Foeder.

Products
Carton's core selection includes "Boat Beer" a session ale, "Brunch. Dinner. Grub. (B.D.G.)" a table ale, "077XX" an East Coast Double IPA, "Carton of Milk" a session nitro milk stout, "This Town" a helles lager and "The Hook" a Late Hopped Wheated Pale Ale.

After moving into their new facility, Carton utilized its original space by repurposing it into a sour house thus creating "Carton Brewing OWC". Carton Brewing OWC is a new program focused on creating fine wild ales, sours, stouts etc. 

Carton also frequently collaborates with other breweries. Collaborators include Other Half Brewing Company, Trillium Brewing Company, Barrier Brewing Co., Interboro Spirits & Ales, Green Flash Brewing Company, Alpine Beer Company, Industrial Arts Brewing Company, Cape May Brewing Company, Bolero Snort Brewery, Against The Grain Brewery, Burial Beer Co., and Magnify Brewing Company. In 2018, Carton launched the collaborative &telier (a combination of & and atelier) label. &telier is an open-source term that can be used for collaboration between any breweries experimenting outside the bounds of their typical style of brewing.

See also
Alcohol laws of New Jersey
Beer in New Jersey
List of wineries, breweries, and distilleries in New Jersey

References

Beer brewing companies based in New Jersey
Tourist attractions in Monmouth County, New Jersey
2011 establishments in New Jersey
Atlantic Highlands, New Jersey
Privately held companies based in New Jersey